Tonsea (Tonsea’) is an Austronesian language of the northern tip of Sulawesi, Indonesia. It belongs to the Minahasan branch of the Philippine languages.

References

Further reading
 WATUSEKE, F. S. “MINAHASISCHE LIEDEREN UIT TONSÉA’”. In: Bijdragen Tot de Taal-, Land- En Volkenkunde 136, no. 2/3 (1980): 353–71. http://www.jstor.org/stable/27863311.

Languages of Sulawesi
Minahasan languages